The Crimson Key is a 1947 American mystery film directed by Eugene Forde and written by Irving Elman, starring Kent Taylor, Doris Dowling and Dennis Hoey. It was released on July 2 by 20th Century Fox.

Plot

Private detective Larry Morgan is hired by a Mrs. Swann to investigate her husband, who is soon found dead in the studio of Peter Vandaman, an artist. Mrs. Swann is concerned about a missing key belonging to her husband.

Morgan encounters a receptionist, Miss Phillips, who was in love with Swann, and a man, Steven Loring, who suspected his wife and Swann of having an affair. Loring's alcoholic wife, Margaret, mentions a Key Club with a special red key to a locker, but before he can check it out, Mrs. Swann is murdered and Morgan is beaten by thugs and nearly drugged by a woman named Heidi. He eventually discovers Loring's wife to be the murderess.

Cast   
Kent Taylor as Lawrence 'Larry' Morgan
Doris Dowling as Margaret Loring
Dennis Hoey as Steven Loring
Louise Currie as Heidi
Ivan Triesault as Peter Vandaman
Arthur Space as Det. Capt. Fitzroy
Vera Marshe as Daisy 'Dizzy' Nelson
Edwin Rand as Jeffrey Regan III
Bernadene Hayes as Mrs. Swann
Victoria Horne as Miss Phillips
Douglas Evans as Dr. Kenneth G. Swann 
Ann Doran as Paris Wood
Victor Sen Yung as Wing
Ralf Harolde as Gunman

References

External links 
 

1947 films
1940s English-language films
20th Century Fox films
American mystery films
1947 mystery films
Films directed by Eugene Forde
American black-and-white films
1940s American films